ITRS may refer to:

 International Technology Roadmap for Semiconductors, an international body for guiding the semiconductor industry
 International Terrestrial Reference System, for creating earth measurement reference frames